Gary Dion Brandon (born 8 June 1986) is a Caymanian footballer who is a player-manager for East End Unted. He plays as a midfielder and has represented the Cayman Islands during World Cup qualifying matches in 2008 and 2011. He is a technical director the Cayman Islands Football Association.

References

Association football midfielders
Living people
1986 births
Caymanian footballers
Cayman Islands international footballers
Future SC players